In tennis, if a player serves a double fault, they make a mistake with both serves and lose the point.

Amateur Era singles records 

Gerald Patterson allegedly holds the record for the most double faults committed in a Grand Slam final: he committed 27 double faults in a 71-game match against John Hawkes in the 1927 Australian Championships, but still managed to clinch the victory.

At the 1957 Wimbledon Championships, Maria de Amorin committed 17 doubles faults in a row in his second-round encounter against Berna Thung. De Amorin took a set off her opponent, but eventually lost the match.

Open Era singles records 

Double faults have been officially recorded by the top-level professional tennis circuits since 1991.

Only main draw singles matches are included here.

ATP Tour

Among all players, active or retired, the worst average of double faults per match, shared between Henrik Holm and Radomír Vašek, is 7.2, while Gilbert Schaller has the best average, at 1.0.

Most double faults in a match

Most double faults in a three-setter

Most double faults in a two-setter

Most consecutive double faults

Committing four consecutive double faults in a single game

WTA Tour

Anna Kournikova holds the record for the most double faults in a match with 31, in a clash against Miho Saeki that has been labeled as "one of most feeble and unintentionally comical matches of all time".

Most double faults in a match

Most double faults in a game

See also

Ace (tennis)

References

Tennis terminology
Tennis records and statistics